Norman H. Stahl (born January 30, 1931) is an American lawyer who serves as a Senior United States circuit judge of the United States Court of Appeals for the First Circuit and a former United States district judge of the United States District Court for the District of New Hampshire.

Education and career

Stahl was born in Manchester, New Hampshire. He received a Bachelor of Arts degree from Tufts College in 1952. He received a Bachelor of Laws from Harvard Law School in 1955. He was a law clerk for Judge John V. Spalding of the Massachusetts Supreme Judicial Court from 1955 to 1956. He was in private practice of law in Manchester, NH from 1956 to 1990. Devine, Millimet, Stahl & Branch, now named Devine Milliment.

Federal judicial service

Stahl was nominated by President George H. W. Bush on January 24, 1990, to a seat on the United States District Court for the District of New Hampshire vacated by Judge Martin F. Loughlin. He was confirmed by the United States Senate on April 5, 1990, and received commission on April 6, 1990. His service was terminated on June 30, 1992, due to elevation to the First Circuit.

Stahl was nominated by President George H. W. Bush on April 9, 1992, to a seat on the United States Court of Appeals for the First Circuit vacated by Judge David Souter. He was confirmed by the United States Senate on June 26, 1992, and received commission on June 30, 1992. He assumed senior status on April 16, 2001.

Stahl has also served on committees of the Judicial Conference of the United States dealing with the federal judicial budget and with court facilities and securities issues.

See also
 List of Jewish American jurists

References

Sources
FJC Bio

1931 births
20th-century American judges
Harvard Law School alumni
Judges of the United States Court of Appeals for the First Circuit
Judges of the United States District Court for the District of New Hampshire
Living people
New Hampshire lawyers
People from Manchester, New Hampshire
Tufts University alumni
United States court of appeals judges appointed by George H. W. Bush
United States district court judges appointed by George H. W. Bush